The Keweenawan Supergroup is a supergroup of volcanic and sedimentary rocks that fill the Midcontinent Rift System in the U.S. states of Michigan, Wisconsin, and Minnesota.

Stratigraphy
Members of the Keweenawan Supergroup are exposed at the surface only in the Lake Superior region, particularly at the perimeter of the Midcontinent Rift System. To the southeast and southwest, they are covered by sedimentary rocks of Paleozoic age.

The supergroup consists of the following members:

Magnetism
The Powder Mill Group is reversely polarized except for intervals at the base and top of the upper Kallander Creek Volcanics. The Portage Lake Volcanics and all younger formations have normal magnetic polarity.

References

Bibliography

Geologic supergroups of the United States
Geologic groups of Michigan
Geologic groups of Minnesota
Geologic groups of Wisconsin
Stratigraphy of Michigan
Stratigraphy of Wisconsin
Stratigraphy of Minnesota